Glynis Barber (born Glynis van der Riet; 25 October 1955) is a South African actress. She is known for her portrayals of Sgt. Harriet Makepeace in the British police drama Dempsey and Makepeace, Glenda Mitchell in EastEnders, DCI Grace Barraclough in Emmerdale, Fiona Brake in Night and Day, and Soolin in Blake's 7. In 2022, she joined the cast of Hollyoaks as Norma Crow.

Early life
Barber was born in Durban, South Africa, the daughter of Heather Maureen (Robb) and Frederick Werndly Barry van der Riet.

Acting career

Television
Barber studied at the Mountview Academy of Theatre Arts. Acting since 1978, securing small parts such as a secretary in 1980 in Bognor, her breakthrough came in 1981 with her role as Soolin in Series 4 of the BBC science fiction television series Blake's 7 although she had also played a different character in a Series 1 episode.

In 1982, she took the title role in the television series Jane playing a Second World War heroine. This series was filmed against a blue screen allowing for the addition of a cartoon background, an experimental technique in its day. However, Barber is best known for her mid-1980s role of Sgt. Harriet Makepeace in the police drama Dempsey and Makepeace, where she met her future husband, Michael Brandon.

Since 1987, Barber has appeared frequently in plays, films and television series. She also starred in the LWT drama series Night and Day as Fiona Brake. In 2006, she joined the cast of ITV soap, Emmerdale, playing the character of DCI Grace Barraclough, investigating the death of Tom King on Christmas Day. She exited the soap in September 2007, when her character was killed. In 2009, she appeared as hospital administrator Jean McAteer in The Royal, another ITV drama series set in Yorkshire. In the same year, she and Brandon both appeared in an episode of the BBC series New Tricks, entitled "The Truth Is Out There".

On 23 October 2009, it was announced she would play Glenda Mitchell the mother of Ronnie Mitchell, Roxy Mitchell and Danny Mitchell in EastEnders after Jill Gascoine withdrew from the role during her first day on set. On 27 February 2011, it was announced that Barber was to leave EastEnders in March 2011. In February 2015, Barber admitted that she would consider an EastEnders comeback. The star commented: "I’ve always felt that Glenda left with a few unresolved issues. It would be fun to go back and create a little bit of havoc!". Glenda returned for two episodes on 1 January 2016. Barber returned to EastEnders full-time in January 2017 before leaving once again in February.

In September 2013, she appeared in the ITV dancing show Stepping Out with husband Michael Brandon. In August 2019, Barber narrated When Luxury Holidays Go Wrong on C5 and would later appear in the television series The Outpost. Since 2019, she has been narrating the Channel 5 series The Wonderful World of Chocolate. Then in 2022, she joined the cast of Channel 4 soap opera Hollyoaks as Norma Crow.

Theatre
Her stage work has included Macbeth, Killing Time with Dennis Waterman, High Flyers with Hugh Grant, Make Me a Match and The Graduate. In 2011, Barber starred alongside Christopher Timothy and Denis Lill in Alan Ayckbourn's Seasons Greetings, playing Belinda. In 2013, she played Melissa Gardner in Love Letters at Dundee Repertory Theatre along with Michael Brandon. Barber played Carole King's mother, Genie Klein, in the West End production of Beautiful – The Carole King Musical from its opening at the Aldwych Theatre on 24 February 2015 until 28 November 2015.

Film
Her early film roles included the horror film Terror, and the football drama Yesterday's Hero starring Ian McShane. She appeared as Lady Caroline in Michael Winner's 1983 remake of The Wicked Lady, which starred Faye Dunaway. In 1989, she appeared as Elisabeth Jekyll in Edge of Sanity, and the 1997 film Déjà Vu alongside Vanessa Redgrave. She appeared as Anthea Davis in On the Nose in 2001 along with Dan Aykroyd and Robbie Coltrane.

Personal life
Barber married actor Paul Antony-Barber, whom she met at drama school, in 1976; the couple divorced in 1979. In the course of Blake's 7 filming, she had a relationship with co-star Steven Pacey. Barber married her Dempsey and Makepeace co-star Michael Brandon on 18 November 1989; the couple have a son, Alex.

Filmography

Film

Television

Audio

Video games

Awards and nominations

References

External links
 
 

1955 births
Living people
Afrikaner people
British film actresses
British soap opera actresses
British television actresses
Actors from Durban
People from Johannesburg
Actresses from London
South African expatriates in the United Kingdom
South African film actresses
South African soap opera actresses
South African television actresses
Alumni of the Mountview Academy of Theatre Arts